Skim or skimming may refer to:

Sports and games
Skimboarding, also skimming, a sport which involves riding a board on wet sand or shallow water
Snowmobile skipping, also known as skimming, operating a snowmobile on water
Stone skimming, skipping or bouncing a stone on a water surface

Money, crime, and business
Price skimming, a marketing term
Skimming (credit card fraud), a type of credit card fraud
Skimming (fraud), a type of cash fraud

Computers and cybercrime
Skim (software), an open-source PDF reader
Smart Common Input Method, also called 'SKIM' when optimized for the K Desktop Environment
Web skimming, the stealing of payment information via malware injection

Other
Skimming (reading), a process or technique of speed reading
Skim (graphic novel), a Canadian coming-of-age graphic novel

See also
Skim milk or skimmed milk, a variety of milk from which the fat has been removed
Skimmer (disambiguation)
Skin (disambiguation)